Valentina Lodovini (born 14 May 1978) is an Italian film and television actress.

Life and career
Born in Umbertide, Lodovini grew up in Sansepolcro and attended the School of Dramatic Arts in Perugia, then moved in Rome to continue her studies at the Centro Sperimentale di Cinematografia. After some secondary roles, Lodovini emerged in 2007 with Carlo Mazzacurati's drama film La giusta distanza, for which she was nominated for David di Donatello for Best Actress. 

In 2011 Lodovini won the David di Donatello for Best Supporting Actress for the role of Maria in Benvenuti al Sud.  She reprised the role in the film sequel Benvenuti al Nord.

Filmography

Films

Television

References

External links

 
 
 
 

1978 births
Living people
People from Umbertide
Italian film actresses
Italian television actresses
21st-century Italian actresses
Centro Sperimentale di Cinematografia alumni
David di Donatello winners